= Usama Basharat =

Pakistani cricketer (born 1989)

Personal information
- Born: 10 November 1989 (age 37); Karachi, Pakistan
- Source: Cricinfo, 18 March 2021

Usama Basharat (born 11 November 1989) is a Pakistani cricketer. He played in six first-class and fourteen List A matches between 2009 and 2018.
